Faberth Manuel 'Manu' Balda Rodríguez (born 21 February 1992) is an Ecuadorian footballer who plays for C.D. El Nacional as a winger.

Club career
Born in Portoviejo, Balda moved to Barcelona in 2001, aged nine, and started his career at CE L'Hospitalet's youth setup. He finished his formation with UDA Gramenet, and made his senior debuts with the reserves in the 2010–11 campaign; he also appeared with the main squad, being relegated from Segunda División B.

On 30 January 2013 Balda moved to AE Prat, also in the third level. He suffered another relegation in 2013–14, being mostly used as a backup.

On 17 July 2014 Balda signed for fellow league team CF Badalona, and featured regularly for the club during his spell. On 19 January of the following year he rescinded his link and moved to Superleague Greece side Panthrakikos F.C.

Balda played his first match as a professional on 24 January 2015, coming on as a late substitute in a 1–0 home win against Levadiakos F.C.

References

External links

1992 births
Living people
People from Portoviejo
Ecuadorian footballers
Spanish footballers
Association football wingers
Segunda División B players
Tercera División players
Ecuadorian Serie A players
UDA Gramenet footballers
AE Prat players
UE Cornellà players
CF Badalona players
Super League Greece players
Panthrakikos F.C. players
C.D. El Nacional footballers
Atlas F.C. footballers
Ecuadorian expatriate footballers
Spanish expatriate footballers
Spanish expatriate sportspeople in Greece
Expatriate footballers in Greece
Expatriate footballers in Mexico